Casaletto Lodigiano is a comune (municipality) in the Province of Lodi in the Italian region Lombardy, located about  southeast of Milan and about  west of Lodi.

Casaletto Lodigiano borders the following municipalities: Cerro al Lambro, San Zenone al Lambro, Bascapè, Salerano sul Lambro, Caselle Lurani.

References

Cities and towns in Lombardy